Sea Island is an island in the Fraser River estuary in the city of Richmond, British Columbia. It is located south of the city of Vancouver and north and west of Lulu Island. Sea Island is the home to Vancouver International Airport (YVR), a nature conservation area, and a permanent resident population of 814, most of which live in the neighbourhood of Burkeville. A small part of the island is under the administration of the Musqueam Indian Band.

History
The island was traditionally home to the Musqueam Indian Band, and they retain ownership over a tract of land on the island's north-west under the administrative title "Sea Island Indian Reserve #3". Construction of residential neighbourhoods on the island began during World War II. Under the authority of the Wartime Housing Authority, the Boeing Company built a 300 home subdivision to house its workers on Sea Island. This neighbourhood on the island's east side became known as Burkeville, and remains a residential neighbourhood to this day.

A second neighbourhood, known as the Cora Brown subdivision, was constructed in 1946 on the north side of the island, originally with 50 houses. Although it grew to the point of requiring the construction of the island's second elementary school in 1962, airport expansion led to the community being disbanded in 1978. No trace of this neighbourhood remains.

Vancouver International Airport

The airport first opened for service on Sea Island in 1931, and began servicing commercial flights in 1937.  The airport received relatively light traffic for the next fifty years until extensive growth in international traffic, primarily between the United States and Asia, necessitated expansion of service.  With investments from the airlines, the Canadian government and a surcharge on tickets for improvement costs, the airport began a significant overhaul in the 1990s.

The airport is the second largest in Canada, with over 25 million passengers passing through each year.  It has grown to three passenger terminals and three main runways servicing over fifty airlines.

Ground transportation
Grant McConachie Way is the primary east–west artery leading to the main airport terminal, while a significant amount of commuter traffic from Vancouver to Richmond crosses Sea Island north-south via Russ Baker Way. Sea Island is connected to Vancouver to the north via the Arthur Laing Bridge, and to Richmond via the No. 2 Road Bridge, Dinsmore Bridge, Moray Bridge and the Sea Island Bridge.  Sea Island is also served by three stations on the Canada Line, part of the SkyTrain rapid transit network, which connects the airport to Downtown Vancouver and Downtown Richmond.

Sea Island Conservation Area
The Sea Island Conservation Area (SICA) is located adjacent to Vancouver International Airport (YVR) and consists of approximately 140.1 hectares (1.4 square kilometres) of land on the north side of Sea Island dedicated for conservation of wildlife and habitat. SICA was transferred to Environment Canada as a compensation package funded by Transport Canada to replace wildlife habitat lost as a result of runway expansion at Vancouver International Airport (YVR). The main goal for management of SICA is to maintain existing populations of wildlife that do not compromise aviation safety.

Habitats on SICA consist of woodland, wetland sloughs, and old agricultural field habitat which support a diversity of birds, land mammals, and terrestrial plants. SICA habitat management discourages populations of flocking birds that may pose hazards to aviation safety, as well as discourages populations of beavers that can cause prevalent, severe and costly damage to habitat.

Sturgeon Bank Wildlife Management Area
Over 50 square kilometres in area, Sturgeon Bank is a marine preserve located off the west side of the island and is made up of intertidal and subtidal waters.  Boating is prohibited in the area.

Beaches and parks
Sea Island boasts two public beaches, McDonald Beach Park and Iona Beach Regional Park.

McDonald Beach is operated by the city of Richmond.  It is a recreational facility, with a dogs off-leash area, picnic areas and boat docking available.

Iona Beach is operated by the Greater Vancouver Regional District, with a focus on wildlife protection, beaches, information on the flora and fauna, as well as a walking trail that culminates in a 4 kilometer jetty out into the Sturgeon Bank. (See also: Iona Island, British Columbia.)

Other services
The island's south shore features a Canadian Coast Guard station, as well as floatplane docks, a business jet terminal and Vancouver Airport's South Terminal. Sea Island is also home to the Aerospace and Aviation Technology faculty of the British Columbia Institute of Technology as well as two hotels run by the Fairmont and Delta chains. There is a luxury designer outlet mall that opened in July 2015, as a joint venture between Vancouver International Airport and the McArthurGlen Group

The Burkeville neighbourhood is served by the Sea Island School, built in 1891, serving grades Kindergarten to Grade Three, after which point students must commute to Lulu Island in Richmond.

See also

98 B-Line (no longer in operation)
Airport Station
Mitchell Island

References

External links
YVR - Airport Conservation Area
YVR - Who We Are
Air Highways Magazine - Vancouver

 
Islands of the Fraser River
Indian reserves in British Columbia
Richmond, British Columbia